WISEP J190648.47+401106.8 (shortened to W1906+40) is an L-dwarf star. In 2015 it was shown to have on its surface a storm the size of Jupiter's Great Red Spot. The storm rotates around the star roughly every 9 hours and has lasted since at least 2013, when observations of the storm began.

W1906+40 is 53.3 (with an uncertainty of +1.17, -1.11) light-years from Earth, has an intrinsic brightness of 0.0002 that of the sun, a radius of 0.9 Jupiters, and a surface temperature of 2,311 K. The star emits significant flares.

References

L-type stars
Lyra (constellation)